Jaime Xenos Cardriche (March 20, 1968July 28, 2000) was an American actor best known for his role as the character "Tim" on Malcolm & Eddie.

Early life 
Cardriche grew up in Cerritos, California and attended Oklahoma State University where he played both football and basketball.

Acting career 
Cardriche appeared primarily in sitcoms such as Family Matters, The Fresh Prince of Bel-Air, A Different World, Malcolm & Eddie, Who's the Boss?, The Wayans Bros., and Hangin' with Mr. Cooper. He was also a professional wrestler, the Harlem Warlord in the Pacific Wrestling Alliance. His last acting appearance was in the episode "A Simple Plan" on the sitcom The Parkers.

He also was a professional wrestler working as the Harlem Warlord for Pacific Wrestling Alliance in 1988.

Death 
Cardriche died on July 28, 2000, from complications during gall bladder surgery aged 32. He is buried at Forest Lawn Memorial Park Cypress.

Filmography

Film

Television

References

External links

1968 births
2000 deaths
20th-century American male actors
Actors from Savannah, Georgia
American football defensive linemen
American male film actors
American male television actors
Oklahoma State Cowboys basketball players
Oklahoma State Cowboys football players
People from Cerritos, California
Players of American football from California
Sportspeople from Los Angeles County, California
American men's basketball players